Northern Ireland competed at the 2022 Commonwealth Games in Birmingham, England between 28 July and 8 August 2022. It was the twentieth Games participation for Northern Ireland.

Lawn bowler Martin McHugh and boxer Michaela Walsh were the delegation's flagbearers during the opening ceremony.

The Games were Northern Ireland's most successful, with them having won their highest number of gold medals, joint highest number of silver medals, and their most medals overall.

Medalists

Competitors
The following is the list of number of competitors participating at the Games per sport/discipline.

Athletics

One para athlete was officially selected on 19 May 2022. Another para athlete and thirteen other athletes were added on 21 June 2022.

On 12 July 2022, CGNI declared that Leon Reid was barred from competing in the Games by BOCCG following a security risk assessment. On 26 July, Paul Pollock withdrew from the Games.

Men
Track and road events

Women
Track and road events

Field events

Combined events – Heptathlon

Badminton

One player (Rachael Darragh) was officially selected on 15 July 2022.

3x3 basketball

On 14 April 2022, Northern Ireland qualified for the men's 3x3 wheelchair basketball tournament by virtue of winning the men's IWBF European Qualifier in Largs, Scotland.

Squad selections were officially announced on 19 May 2022.

Summary

Men's wheelchair tournament

Roster
Matt Rollston
Nathan McCabe
Conn Nagle
James MacSorley

Group B

5th place match

Boxing

A squad of thirteen boxers (eight men, five women) was officially selected on 4 May 2022. Damien Sullivan withdrew from the Games.

Men

Women

Cycling

A squad of eight cyclists was officially selected on 30 June 2022. JB Murphy and Lydia Boylan withdrew from the squad due to injury.

Road
Men

Women

Track
Points race

Scratch race

Mountain Biking

Diving

One diver (Tanya Watson) was officially selected on 1 June 2022.

Gymnastics

Artistic
Men
Individual Qualification

Individual Finals

Judo

A squad of seven judoka (four men, three women) was officially selected on 28 April 2022.

Men

Women

Lawn bowls

A squad of ten bowlers (five per gender) was officially selected on 28 February 2022.

Men

Women

Netball

By virtue of its position in the World Netball Rankings (as of 31 January 2022), Northern Ireland qualified for the tournament.

Complete fixtures were announced in March 2022.

Summary

Roster
Twelve players were selected on 6 June 2022.

Jenna Bowman
Ciara Crosbie
Emma Magee
Georgie McGrath
Caroline O'Hanlon
Michelle Drayne
Niamh Cooper
Frances Keenan
Fionnuala Toner
Michelle Magee
Olivia McDonald
Maria McCann	

Group play

Ninth place match

Swimming

A squad of three para swimmers was selected on 19 May 2022, all having qualified via the World Para Swimming World Rankings for performances registered between 31 December 2020 and 18 April 2022. Seven swimmers were added to the squad on 1 June 2022.

Men

Women

Table tennis

Singles

Doubles

Team

Triathlon

A squad of three paratriathletes (plus one guide) was selected on 19 May 2022, all having qualified via the World Triathlon Para Rankings (as of 28 March 2022). Two more guides were confirmed as of 19 June 2022, plus one triathlete on 11 July 2022.

Individual

Paratriathlon

Weightlifting

Two weightlifters were selected on 11 April 2022. They qualified through their positions in the IWF Commonwealth Ranking List.

See also
Ireland at the 2020 Summer Olympics
Ireland at the 2022 Winter Olympics

References

External links
Northern Ireland Commonwealth Games Council Official site

Nations at the 2022 Commonwealth Games
Northern Ireland at the Commonwealth Games
2022 in Northern Ireland sport